A riderless horse is a single horse without a rider and with boots reversed in the stirrups, which sometimes accompanies a funeral procession. The horse, sometimes  caparisoned in black, follows the caisson carrying the casket. A riderless horse can also be featured in parades (military, police or civilian) to symbolize either fallen soldiers or fallen police officers.

History

United States
In the United States, the riderless horse is part of funerals with military honors given to Army or Marine Corps officers at the rank of colonel or above, as well as funerals of presidents, who served as commander in chief.

Alexander Hamilton, who was Secretary of the Treasury (1789–1795) was the first American to be given the honor. Historian Ron Chernow noted that Hamilton's gray horse followed the casket "with the boots and spurs of its former rider reversed in the stirrups."  

Abraham Lincoln, who was assassinated in 1865, was the first president of the United States to be officially honored by the inclusion of a caparisoned horse in his funeral cortege, although a letter from George Washington's personal secretary recorded the president's horse was part of the president's funeral, carrying his saddle, pistols, and holsters.

Australia
In Australia, a riderless horse known as the 'Lone Charger' sometimes leads the annual Anzac Day marches.

Notable horses

Old Bob 
In 1865, Abraham Lincoln was honored by the inclusion of a riderless horse at his funeral. When Lincoln's funeral train reached Springfield, Illinois, his horse, Old Bob, who was draped in a black mourning blanket, followed the procession and led mourners to Lincoln's burial spot.

Black Jack 

A notable riderless horse was "Black Jack," a half-Morgan named for General of the Armies John "Black Jack" Pershing. Black Jack took part in the state funerals of Presidents John F. Kennedy (1963),
Herbert Hoover (1964), and Lyndon Johnson (1973), and General of the Army Douglas MacArthur (1964).

Black Jack was foaled January 19, 1947, and came to Fort Myer from Fort Reno, Oklahoma, on November 22, 1952. Black Jack was the last of the Quartermaster-issue horses branded with the Army's U.S. brand (on the left shoulder) and his Army serial number 2V56 (on the left side of his neck). He died on February 6, 1976, and was buried on the parade ground of Fort Myer's Summerall Field with full military honors, one of only four US Army horses to be given that honor, along with Chief, the US Army's last living operational cavalry mount at the time of his death, Sergeant Reckless, a highly-decorated packhorse who served with the Recoilless Rifle Platoon, Anti-Tank Company, 5th Marine Regiment, 1st Marine Division in the Korean War, and Comanche, one of the only survivors of the Battle of Little Bighorn.

Dolly 

"Dolly", was the 22 year old charger (whose official name was Octave) of Admiral of the Fleet The Earl Mountbatten of Burma in his capacity as Colonel of the Life Guards. Following the assassination of Lord Mountbatten by the IRA in Mullaghmore, Dolly served as the riderless horse in the funeral procession being led ahead the head of the gun carriage with the Lord Mountbatten's boots (from his Colonel's uniform) reversed in the stirrups on 5 September 1979.

Sergeant York 

"Sergeant York" was formerly known as "Allaboard Jules", a racing standardbred gelding. He was renamed (in honor of famous WWI soldier Alvin C. York) when he was accepted into the military in 1997. He served as the riderless horse in President Ronald Reagan's funeral procession, walking behind the caisson bearing Reagan's flag-draped casket. In the stirrups were President Reagan's personal riding boots.

He was foaled in 1991, sired by Royce and out of the mare Amtrak Collins sired by Computer. He is a descendant of the great standardbred racing stallions Albatross, Tar Heel and Adios.

See also 
Honor guard
Military funeral
Military rites
 Missing man formation
State funeral

References 

Funeral transport
Death customs
Military traditions
Horses in culture
State ritual and ceremonies